ColorTyme is an American rent-to-own business, currently a wholly owned subsidiary of Rent-A-Center.

Litigation 
In 1994, the Minnesota Supreme Court ruled in Miller v. ColorTyme that the lease agreements offered by ColorTyme were covered under the state's Consumer Credit Sales Act, and that the lease agreements were therefore not leases but sales on credit. The court further held that the company was charging usurious rates of interest to its customers. A similar lawsuit, filed by the office of Wisconsin Attorney General James E. Doyle in 1993, resulted in the company being fined $25,000 and required to disclose interest rates and other credit terms to consumers. ColorTyme later settled a class action lawsuit brought by the Legal Aid Society of Milwaukee by agreeing to pay $2.9 million, including $675,000 in interest-free loans to low-income individuals and families.

References 

Companies based in Texas
Furniture retailers of the United States
Companies based in Plano, Texas